Kim Ha-neul (born February 21, 1978) is a South Korean actress. After starting her career as a model, she rose to fame by starring in romantic-comedy films My Tutor Friend (2003) and Too Beautiful to Lie (2004) and the action-comedy film My Girlfriend Is an Agent (2009). In 2011, Kim won Best Actress at the 48th Grand Bell Awards and the 32nd Blue Dragon Film Awards for her performance in the serial killer thriller Blind. Her television work includes romance series Romance (2002) and A Gentleman's Dignity (2012), On Air (2008), the melodrama On the Way to the Airport (2016) and the drama fantasy 18 Again (2020), a Korean version of 17 Again led by Zac Efron.

Early and personal life

Kim Ha-neul was born on February 21, 1978, in Seoul, South Korea. Her given name "Ha-neul" means “sky” in Korean. Her immediate family consists of her parents and one younger brother. She attended the Seoul Institute of the Arts.

Kim married a businessman, on March 19, 2016. On October 9, 2017, Kim announced that she is expecting her first child. On May 27, 2018, she gave birth to a daughter.

She is a Roman Catholic.

Career

1996–2000: Early career
Kim Ha-neul started her career by modeling for clothing brand Storm in 1996. She then made her acting debut in the 1998 film Bye June alongside Yoo Ji-tae. In 1999, she starred a medical drama film Doctor K, which earned her first acting award nomination. In the same year, she made appearances in television dramas Happy Together and Into the Sunlight, and featured in the music video for "To Heaven" by Jo Sung-mo. Later, she reunited with Yoo Ji-tae in 2000's sci-fi romance Ditto, and rose to fame as an actress.

2001–2007: Rise to popularity
Kim's breakout role was in romance melodrama series Piano, in which she played a pure, fragile young woman. The series was the second most successful drama of 2001, achieving a peak rating of 40.2%. She then starred in 2002 hit Romance alongside Kim Jae-won, which led her to stardom and won her Top Excellence Award in acting. In 2003, she raised her profile through the huge box-office hit My Tutor Friend, where she acted as a college girl tasked with helping a delinquent student her own age graduate from high school alongside her opposite Kwon Sang-woo. In 2004, she starred in Too Beautiful to Lie, as an ex-convict who pretends to be the fiancée of a man being pressured to marry by his nosy, close-knit family. Due to the success of her films, Kim was dubbed "the queen of romantic comedies" by the Korean press.

In 2004, she starred in mountain-climbing drama Ice Rain, horror film Dead Friend and the melodrama Stained Glass. Kim then returned to the familiar romance genre with 2006 romantic comedy Almost Love, in the role of an aspiring actress with stage fright, which also reunited her with My Tutor Friend co-star Kwon Sang-woo. This was followed by Lovers of Six Years, about a longtime couple facing relationship problems.

2008–2012: Revived career
In 2008, Kim starred in  On Air, a Kim Eun-sook penned drama which gives viewers a behind-the-scenes look at a television drama production. Kim plays a top actress with an arrogant personality in the series. The drama raised Kim's popularity and earned her acting recognition at the Korea Drama Awards. The following year, Kim starred in spy romantic comedy My Girlfriend Is an Agent. The film was a box-office success, and earned positive reviews for its quality and performance.

 In 2010, Kim played a medical student torn between two soldiers in Korean War drama Road No. 1. Despite strong hype and a  budget, the series received low ratings.

She bounced back in 2011 with serial killer thriller Blind, where she challenged herself by portraying a visually impaired former detective who becomes witness to a murder. Her performance won her Best Actress honors at the Grand Bell Awards and Blue Dragon Film Awards. This was followed by another rom-com You're My Pet, adapted from the Japanese josei manga Kimi wa Petto.

In 2012, Kim returned to the small screen as a high school ethics teacher who falls for a playboy architect (played by Jang Dong-gun) in the hit drama A Gentleman's Dignity. Made by the same team behind On Air (writer Kim Eun-sook and director Shin Woo-chul), the series revolved around the love lives of four male friends in their forties.

2015–present: Return to the screen
In 2015, Kim was cast in her first Chinese film, romantic comedy Making Family opposite Aarif Rahman.

In 2016, Kim starred in crowdfunded indie feature Don't Forget Me opposite Jung Woo-sung.  In September, she made her small-screen comeback in four years, starring in romance melodrama On the Way to the Airport opposite Lee Sang-yoon.

In 2017, she starred in Misbehavior, playing an unloved teacher at a boys' high school. Kim then featured in fantasy blockbuster With God.

In 2019, Kim returned to the small screen in JTBC melodrama The Wind Blows.

In 2020, Kim starred in the romance drama 18 Again, based on the 2009 film 17 Again.

In March 2021, Kim signed a contract with IOK Company.

Filmography

Film

Television series

Web series

Music video appearances

Discography

Awards and nominations

References

External links

 
 

1978 births
Living people
People from Seoul
South Korean television actresses
South Korean film actresses
21st-century South Korean actresses
Seoul Institute of the Arts alumni
South Korean Roman Catholics
Best Actress Paeksang Arts Award (film) winners